The Spirit of Christmas is a studio album by Washington, D.C.-based go-go musician Chuck Brown, released in 1999.  This is Chuck Brown's first and only Christmas album, and features go-go renditions of nine traditional Christmas carols, including the remake of Johnny Moore's Three Blazers song "Merry Christmas, Baby".

Track listing

Personnel
 Chuck Brown – lead vocals, electric Guitar
 John M. Buchannan – keyboards, trombone
 Leroy Fleming – tenor saxophone, background vocals
 Curtis Johnson – keyboards
 Donald Tillery – trumpet, background vocals
 Ricardo D. Wellman – drums
 Rowland Smith – congas, background vocals
 Glenn Ellis – bass guitar, percussion

References

Chuck Brown albums
1999 Christmas albums
Christmas albums by American artists